Kankavli taluka is a taluka in Sindhudurg district of Maharashtra an Indian state.

References

Talukas in Sindhudurg district
Talukas in Maharashtra